Weston is a town on the west coast of the state of Sabah in Malaysia. It is located in the Interior Division of Sabah, and is about 100 kilometres south of Sabah's capital Kota Kinabalu. Weston is one of the towns along the Pan Borneo Highway.

References 

Towns in Sabah